The Lagos state Task force against Human Trafficking is a Nigerian task force established by the Lagos state Government to tackle human trafficking and irregular migration. The Executive Governor of Lagos State, Babajide Sanwo-Olu inaugurated the state task force on human trafficking at the Government house on the 8th September 2020, with the overall objective of coordinating a multi-sectoral response towards the prevention of human trafficking, offering access to justice for victims of trafficking, prosecution of traffickers and enhancing the process of successful restoration of survivors to the state of physical, psycho-social, vocational and economic well-being. This task force is currently being replicated in other south western states of Nigeria.

Mission
The Lagos State Task Force on Human Trafficking was formed to curb the menace of human trafficking and irregular migration in the state through inter-agency cooperation.

Objectives
Coordinating and reactivating technical inter-agency cooperation in the fight against TIP (Trafficking In Persons)
Assisting in the rehabilitation and reintegration of victims of Trafficking in Lagos state.
Developing a work plan for lagos in the collective fight against trafficking in person using the  national Zero draft Template.
Researching and promoting strategies in tackling TIP.

Partners and affiliate
NAPTIP
International Organization for Migration (IOM).
Patriotic Citizens' Initiatives (PCI).
Child Protection Network (CPN).

Reference

Government agencies and parastatals of Lagos State
Organizations that combat human trafficking
Human trafficking in Nigeria